Margit Brataas (née Karlsen, December 28, 1903 – December 17, 1971) was a Norwegian actress.

Brataas was born in Kristiania (now Oslo), the daughter of Svend Marus Karlsen (1882–?) and Hilma Mathilde Karlsen (1877–?). She made her film debut in 1942 in Toralf Sandø's film Det æ'kke te å tru, followed by Vi gifter oss (1951), Trine! (1952), and Balladen om mestertyven Ole Høiland (1970). She also performed at the People's Theater in Oslo.

Filmography
1942: Det æ'kke te å tru as Gina, a dancer
1951: Vi gifter oss as Hansen's housekeeper
1952: Trine! as Gurine
1970: Balladen om mestertyven Ole Høiland

References

External links
 
 Margit Brataas at Filmfront

1903 births
1971 deaths
20th-century Norwegian actresses
Actresses from Oslo
Norwegian stage actresses
Norwegian film actresses